Mumbai Indians are  a franchise cricket team based in Mumbai, Maharashtra, that competes in the Indian Premier League and is the most successful team of the tournament with 5 titles. Founded in 2008, the team is owned by India's biggest conglomerate, Reliance Industries, through its 100% subsidiary Indiawin Sports. Since its establishment, the team has played its home matches in the 33,108-capacity Wankhede Stadium in Mumbai.

In 2017, the Mumbai Indians became the first franchise to cross the $100 million mark in brand value among the IPL franchises. The brand value of Mumbai Indians, in 2019, is estimated to be around ₹809 crore (roughly $115 million), the highest among all the IPL franchises for the fourth consecutive year.

Mumbai Indians won the 2011 Champions League Twenty20 after beating Royal Challengers Bangalore by 31 runs in the final. The team won the double by winning its first IPL title, in 2013, by defeating Chennai Super Kings by 23 runs in the final, and then defeated the Rajasthan Royals by 33 runs to win its second Champions League Twenty20 title later that year. They won their second IPL title on 24 May 2015 by defeating the Chennai Super Kings by 41 runs in the final and became the third team to win more than one IPL title. On 21 May 2017, they won their third IPL title by defeating the Rising Pune Supergiant by 1 run in a thrilling final, thus becoming the first team to win three IPL titles. While playing the tournament, they won their 100th T20, becoming the first team to do so. In 2019, they repeated the same feat as they won a record breaking fourth IPL title, by beating CSK by just 1 run on 12 May 2019 in the IPL Final. They became the first team to win the IPL title for the fifth time, by beating Delhi Capitals by 5 wickets on 10 November 2020 in the IPL Final.

Mumbai Indians are currently captained by Rohit Sharma. Mahela Jayawardene was appointed as head coach of Mumbai Indians before the 2017 season. Sharma is the leading run scorer of the team while Lasith Malinga is the leading wicket taker of the team.

Franchise history
The Board of Control for Cricket in India (BCCI) announced in September 2007 the establishment of the Indian Premier League, a Twenty20 competition to be started in 2008. In January 2008, the BCCI unveiled the owners of eight city-based franchises. The Mumbai franchise was sold to the Reliance Industries Ltd (RIL) for $111.9 million, making it the most expensive team to be sold in the league. RIL, owned by Mukesh Ambani acquired the rights to the franchise for a period of 10 years.

Team history

2008–2009: Struggle in the initial seasons

The Indian Premier League named four players as icon players for their respective city franchises which made the players unavailable to play for any team other than their city team. Sachin Tendulkar was named Mumbai's icon player. The icon player was also entitled to earn 15% more than the next-best paid player in their team. At first player auctions for the inaugural IPL season conducted in February 2008, the Mumbai franchise bought several star international cricketers such as Sanath Jayasuriya, Harbhajan Singh, Shaun Pollock, Lasith Malinga and Robin Uthappa. The franchise named Sachin Tendulkar as the captain of the team and appointed former India cricketer Lalchand Rajput as the head coach. However, Tendulkar was injured before the start of the 2008 season due to which Harbhajan Singh took over as the captain in the initial stage of the season. The team got off to a bad start in the season losing their first four games by some comprehensive margins. Their first match was a five-wicket defeat to the Royal Challengers Bangalore on 20 April 2008 at the Wankhede. Their stand-in captain, Harbhajan, was suspended from the tournament for reportedly slapping Sreesanth during Mumbai's league match against Kings XI Punjab. After Harbhajan's suspension, Shaun Pollock assumed the leadership duties until Tendulkar's return on 24 May. Under Pollock's captaincy, Mumbai won six out of their next six games which left them needing to win two more out of the remaining four matches to qualify for the semi-finals. Mumbai suffered three last-over defeats in the next three games, including two off the last ball, before winning their last league match. They finished fifth in the points table with 7 wins and 7 losses, missing out on a semi-final spot by just one point.

The 2009 season was played in South Africa as it coincided with multi-phase 2009 Indian general elections due to which the Government of India refused to commit the Indian paramilitary forces to provide security for the IPL. Before the start of the season, Mumbai Indians traded Robin Uthappa for Zaheer Khan with Royal Challengers Bangalore, and Ashish Nehra for Shikhar Dhawan with the Delhi Daredevils. Shaun Pollock retired after the first season and became the head coach of the team. Lasith Malinga, who missed the previous season due to an injury, returned to the team. At the player auction, Mumbai bought South African batsman JP Duminy to strengthen their batting department. After winning their opening match against the Chennai Super Kings, Mumbai struggled to put up consistent performances during the season. They relied heavily on Duminy and Tendulkar's batting, and Malinga's bowling along with minimal contributions from other players. With only five wins from 14 matches, Mumbai finished on seventh place in the league table.

2010–2012: Rise as a strong team

At the 2010 players auction, Mumbai Indians bought Trinidadian all-rounder Kieron Pollard for $750,000 following a secret tiebreaker. After the auction, they signed up ten uncapped Indian players out of whom seven were former ICL players. Former India cricketer Robin Singh was named as the head coach of the team as Pollock took up the role of bowling coach. Mumbai had to shift their home venue to Brabourne Stadium for the season since the Wankhede was undergoing renovation to host some matches of the 2011 ICC Cricket World Cup. Mumbai won seven of their first eight games to take the top spot in the points table. Their success was mainly due to the efforts of Tendulkar, Malinga, Harbhajan, Ambati Rayudu and Saurabh Tiwary. They won three of the remaining six league games and finished with 20 points from 14 games at the top of the points table. They beat the Royal Challengers Bangalore by 35 runs in the semi-final, thanks to Pollard's all-round efforts (33* from 13 balls, and 3/17). At the final, they were defeated by the Chennai Super Kings by 22 runs. The Mumbai team management was criticised for the "strategic errors" during the final such as sending Abhishek Nayar and Harbhajan at batting positions 3 and 4 respectively while Duminy and Pollard were sent at 7 and 8. Mumbai skipper Sachin Tendulkar, who scored 618 runs at an average of 47.53 and strike rate of 132.6, won the Orange Cap for scoring most runs in the season. Mumbai qualified for the 2010 Champions League Twenty20 where they were eliminated in the group stage with two wins and two defeats in four matches.

In 2011, with the addition of two new teams to the IPL, the IPL Governing Council declared that each franchise could retain a maximum of four players of their 2010 squad, and the rest of the international players would be auctioned. Mumbai Indians retained Tendulkar, Harbhajan, Pollard and Malinga for a sum of $4.5 million. This retention left the franchise with the power of spending $4.5 million at the auction where they purchased Indian batsman Rohit Sharma for $2 million, former Australian all-rounder Andrew Symonds for $850,000, and pacer Munaf Patel for $700,000. Mumbai won eight of their first ten league games following which they suffered a loss of form that led to three consecutive defeats and a last-ball win in their last league match. They finished third on the points table with 18 points from 14 games and qualified for the Eliminator. The Eliminator was played at the Wankhede where Mumbai faced the Kolkata Knight Riders. After winning the toss and electing to bowl first, Mumbai restricted Kolkata to 147 in 20 overs and chased down the target for the loss of six wickets with four balls to spare. Munaf Patel won the Man of the Match for his bowling figures of 3/27. With this win, Mumbai qualified for the Qualifying final against Royal Challengers Bangalore, the winner of which would play the Super Kings in the final. Mumbai skipper Tendulkar won the toss once again and put their opposition into bat who set Mumbai a target of 186. Mumbai kept losing wickets at regular intervals from the start of their innings and could score only 142/8, falling short by 43 runs. The top two leading wicket-takers of the season were Mumbai Indians pacers Lasith Malinga and Munaf Patel with 28 and 22 wickets respectively.

Mumbai qualified for the 2011 Champions League Twenty20 held in India. Before the start of the tournament, six first-choice Indian players in the Mumbai squad including Tendulkar, Sharma and Patel were ruled out of the tournament due to injuries and two more Indian players were ruled out based on medical reports. This left their 14-member squad with only six Indian players, while the tournament allowed a maximum of four overseas players and minimum of seven local players in the playing eleven. An exception was made for the Mumbai Indians which permitted them to field five overseas players during the tournament. Harbhajan was named the stand-in captain in the absence of Tendulkar. Mumbai was placed in Group A alongside Chennai Super Kings, New South Wales Blues, Cape Cobras and Trinidad & Tobago. Mumbai had two wins, one defeat and one no result in the group stage which gave them second place on the group points table with five points. They qualified for the semi-final and Mumbai batsman Suryakumar Yadav returned to the squad after recovering from his injury. This led to the withdrawal of the concession given by the Champions League for the Mumbai Indians to field five overseas players. Mumbai faced Somerset County Cricket Club in the semi-final at Chennai. Batting first, Mumbai made 160/5 in 20 overs. Somerset's chase was dented by Malinga who picked four wickets for 20 (all bowled) to help Mumbai restrict Somerset to 150 and win the match by 10 runs. The final was also played in Chennai where Mumbai met Royal Challengers Bangalore. Mumbai batted first and managed only 139 in 20 overs. Bangalore started strongly in the run-chase putting 38 for the first wicket before Malinga broke the partnership. Harbhajan then picked up the key wickets of Chris Gayle and Virat Kohli triggering a batting collapse and eventually Bangalore were bowled out for 108, giving Mumbai a 31-run victory and their first-ever title. Harbhajan was named player of the match and Malinga won the man of the tournament award. Andrew Symonds retired from all forms of cricket in early 2012.

Before the start of the 2012 season, the Mumbai Indians traded Dinesh Karthik from Kings XI Punjab and Pragyan Ojha from the Deccan Chargers for undisclosed sums. At the auction, the franchise bought five players including R. P. Singh, Thisara Perera (both for $600,000) and Mitchell Johnson. Tendulkar stepped down from captaincy hours before the season's first game following which Harbhajan was appointed as the captain. In the first half of the league stage, Mumbai had four wins and four defeats, including three losses at home. Mumbai did not have a fixed opening combination, with Tendulkar missing out four matches due to an injury and other opening batsmen failing to show consistency. Johnson was ruled out of the rest of the season in late April with an injury and Dwayne Smith was named his replacement in the squad. Mumbai fared better in the second half of the league stage, winning six of their eight matches. They finished third on the points table with 20 points from 16 matches and qualified for the Eliminator against the fourth-placed Chennai Super Kings at Bangalore. Mumbai won the toss and put Chennai in to bat first. After losing two wickets inside the first two overs, Chennai managed to put up 187/5 in 20 overs mainly because of their captain MS Dhoni's unbeaten 20-ball 51. Mumbai's chase had started solidly with the score reading 47/0 in the fifth over, before they started losing wickets at regular intervals to end at 149/9 and lose the match by 38 runs. They gained direct qualification to the 2012 Champions League Twenty20 in South Africa, along with the three IPL teams that finished at the top that season. Mumbai, placed in Group B, was winless in the tournament with three defeats and one no result.

2013: The IPL and CLT20 Double

The 2013 IPL saw Anil Kumble being appointed as the chief mentor, after he quit a similar position from Royal Challengers Bangalore. With a slump in batting form of Ricky Ponting, he was eventually dropped from the playing eleven and Rohit Sharma took lead of the team. Having the experienced advice of the likes of Anil Kumble, Jonty Rhodes and Sachin Tendulkar, the team emerged victorious in IPL 2013.

In the year 2013, Mumbai Indians started off by losing against the Royal Challengers Bangalore because of the efforts of Chris Gayle and pace bowler Vinay Kumar, but they were able to make a comeback in that match because of Dinesh Karthik due to which Mumbai lost by just one run. In the second match against the Chennai Super Kings, the openers went off but because of the efforts of Dinesh Karthik and Kieron Pollard, Mumbai had put a defendable score on the board. The Mumbai Indians bowlers started off well by dismissing Murali Vijay and the match went off till the last over, with the Super Kings needing 16 off the last over with MS Dhoni on strike and Munaf Patel to bowl; Patel dismissed Dhoni on the first ball and Mumbai won the match comfortably by 9 runs. In their third match against the Delhi Daredevils, Mumbai once again lost their openers Ricky Ponting and Sachin Tendulkar and this time it was again Dinesh Karthik who brought the match in Mumbai's grasp, but this time it was not Kieron Pollard but it was Rohit Sharma with him which helped the Mumbai Indians reach the formidable score of 209/5. At one stage, it looked that David Warner would snatch the game away from Mumbai but the Mumbai Indians bowlers got rid of David Warner by dismissing him and then the Delhi Daredevils collapsed due to which Mumbai Indians won comfortably by 44 runs. In the next match against the Pune Warriors India, Mumbai got off to a flying start with a 54-run opening stand between the so-called Pon-dulkar (Ricky Ponting and Sachin Tendulkar) and then it was followed by Rohit Sharma due to which Mumbai scored 183/3 and won the match comfortably by 41 runs. In the next match against the Rajasthan Royals, Mumbai was bundled out for just 92, giving the Rajasthan Royals an 83-run victory due to which Ricky Ponting stepped down as the captain and retired from all forms of cricket. With Rohit Sharma in good batting form, he was made the captain. Under his captaincy, the Mumbai Indians improved a lot and won their first IPL title.

They continued their winning streak in the Champions League Twenty20. But in the Champions League, too, they had quite a slow start which saw them having to win their final match of the league stage against the Perth Scorchers by a margin; they did it by the combined efforts of Nathan Coulter-Nile, Dwayne Smith and skipper Rohit Sharma. In the final, Glenn Maxwell scored a quickfire 14-ball 37. Mumbai posted 202/6 and won the match comfortably by 33 runs.

2014–2018 
In 2014, Mumbai Indians didn't start off well, losing 5 of their matches in the UAE leg against Kolkata Knight Riders, Royal Challengers Bangalore, Chennai Super Kings and Delhi Daredevils by big margins, but did well in their 5th match against Sunrisers Hyderabad, but consequently lost the matches against respective opponents.

In the Indian leg, they made a comeback by beating Kings XI Punjab who were at the top of the table at that time. After that, they were inconsistent with their performance. They won against Royal Challengers Bangalore but lost against Chennai Super Kings. They won against the Sunrisers Hyderabad and again lost against Kolkata Knight Riders. But after losing against the Kolkata Knight Riders, they won against Kings XI Punjab and the Delhi Daredevils respectively.

In the match against Kings XI Punjab, Lendl Simmons scored a hundred due to which they won comfortably by seven wickets.

With one game left to play, they were fifth in the table with 12 points. In the last league-stage match of the season against Rajasthan Royals who were fourth in the league table with 14 points, they needed to win by a big margin so as to leapfrog the opponent into the fourth spot and claim the play-offs spot too. Rajasthan Royals set the target of 190 runs but Mumbai Indians had to reach the target in 14.3 overs in order to improve the net run rate and claim the fourth position in the table, but they just managed a tie with the Rajasthan Royals in 14.3 overs. So, the Mumbai Indians needed a boundary off the next ball to push Rajasthan Royals below and claim that fourth spot, and Aditya Tare hit a six to a full toss bowled by James Faulkner. Due to that six, they reached the play-offs of IPL but lost against the Chennai Super Kings in the eliminator which ended their IPL 2014 campaign.

The Mumbai Indians qualified in the qualifier round of the CLT20 2014. Due to injury to their skipper Rohit Sharma, Kieron Pollard was named as their captain.

In the first match, they faced the FBT20 2014 champions Lahore Lions but they lost against them with Lahore Lions winning by 6 wickets in 18.4 overs. In the second match, they faced the Southern Express, who had a slow start and lost wickets regularly but managed to score 161/6 in 20 overs. The Mumbai Indians started off with an excellent opening partnership of 139 runs in just 14 overs but lost their first wicket on the 4th ball of the 15th over, but skipper Kieron Pollard ended things off in a blistering way, scoring 20 runs from just 7 balls. But in the last match against the Northern Knights, they just managed 132 runs which the Northern Knights won comfortably by 6 wickets with 16 balls to spare. In this way, Mumbai's CLT20 2014 campaign ended.

Mumbai Indians won their second IPL title in 2015 after they defeated Chennai Super Kings by 41 runs. They started the season with 4 IPL defeats mainly due to their bowling. They lost Aaron Finch and Corey Anderson due to injury for the rest of the season, which meant Lendl Simmons got a chance back into the team and with the help of 6 half-centuries, gave the team solid starts throughout the season. He was the top scorer for Mumbai with 540 runs and joint second (with Ajinkya Rahane) in total for the season behind David Warner. The introduction of another strike bowler Mitchell McClenaghan in the team provided good support to Lasith Malinga upfront. Mumbai went on to win 9 out of their last 10 matches to win the title, thanks to solid batting performances from Simmons, Rohit Sharma, Ambati Rayudu and Kieron Pollard and good bowling from Malinga, McClenaghan and Harbhajan Singh.

In the Vivo IPL 2016 Auction, Mumbai Indians bought Tim Southee, Nathu Singh, Jos Buttler, Jitesh Sharma, KP Kamath, Krunal Pandya and Deepak Punia. They finished the season in the fifth spot in the points table.

In IPL 2017, the Mumbai Indians finished at the top of the points table, winning 10 out of 14 matches. They went on to win the trophy after beating Rising Pune Supergiant in a nail-biting finish. This was their 3rd IPL title and with it they became the most successful team in the history of IPL.

In IPL 2018, the Mumbai Indians finished at fifth spot after winning 6 and losing 8 matches.

2019–present 
In 2019, Mumbai Indians and Chennai Super Kings played in the final of Vivo IPL 2019 where Mumbai defeated Chennai by 1 run to become champions for the record 4th time. The final of IPL 2019 had a thriller end which saw Chennai Super Kings needing 2 runs off the last delivery, where Mumbai Indians bowler Lasith Malinga took a wicket on the last delivery and won the match for Mumbai Indians. Mumbai Indians defeated Chennai Super Kings by 1 run to lift the IPL trophy for the record fourth time. Mumbai Indians became the only team to have four IPL trophies, and the most successful team ever.

Hardik Pandya scored 91 runs off just 34 balls against Kolkata Knight Riders and made the fastest 50 off just 17 balls in that match.

Alzarri Joseph recorded the best bowling figures – 6/12 in the IPL history in the match against Sunrisers Hyderabad which was also his IPL debut.

In IPL auction 2020, Mumbai Indians added 6 new names to their squad that are Chris Lynn (₹20 million), Nathan Coulter-Nile (₹80 million), Saurabh Tiwary (₹5 million), Mohsin Khan (₹2 million), Digvijay Deshmukh (₹2 million), and Balwant Rai Singh (₹2 million).

In 2020, the matches were played in the UAE due to the rising cases of COVID-19 in India. Though with a strong team, Mumbai Indians was underrated due to their records in the UAE and due to a superstition of winning titles in odd years. But Mumbai Indians broke all those talks, went on to be the season's most successful team and clinched their fifth title.

Before the 2021 Auction, Mumbai Indians released Mitchell McClenaghan, Sherfane Rutherford, Digvijay Deshmukh, Prince Balwant Rai Singh, James Pattinson and Nathan Coulter-Nile.

In the 2021 Auction, Mumbai Indians got back Nathan Coulter-Nile (₹50 million), Adam Milne (₹32 million), Piyush Chawla (₹24 million), Marco Jansen (₹2 million), James Neesham (₹5 million), Arjun Tendulkar (₹2 million), and Yudhvir Singh Charak (₹2 million).

In the initial matches, Mumbai Indians struggled on the slow pitch of Chennai which was one of the neutral venues for IPL 2021. They lost 3 games out of the first 5 they played. The main reason was their failure of the lower middle order. Mumbai Indians won their next 2 games and the middle order showing some improvement made crucial contributions to seal the win. They eventually ended the season at number 5 spot.

In 2022 two new teams were introduced. Ahead of 2022 IPL mega auctions the team retained 4 players who were Rohit Sharma, Jasprit Bumrah, Kieron Pollard and Surya Kumar Yadav. They left Hardik Pandya who was one of their core players for a long time. In the mega auctions they purchased back Ishan Kishan for a hefty sum of ₹15.25 which is the second highest bid for an Indian player till date.

They begun the season with a poor note of losing their first 8 matches which is the worst in the history of tournament. They ended the tournament with 4 wins out 14 matches making the 15th season as their worst by finishing at the bottom of the points table.

Home ground

The Mumbai Indians played home games at the DY Patil Stadium in Navi Mumbai for the first two 
IPL seasons. In the third season, in 2010, they played all seven home games at the Brabourne Stadium while the Wankhede Stadium underwent renovation to host group matches and the final of the 2011 ICC Cricket World Cup. Mumbai Indians won six out of the seven matches at the Brabourne Stadium that season.

Mumbai Indians now play their home games at Wankhede Stadium in Mumbai. The stadium is named after former BCCI President S. K. Wankhede. The stadium is owned by the Mumbai Cricket Association and has a seating capacity of 33,108.

Team identity

Team name, motto and logo design

The motto of the team is "Duniya Hila Denge Hum...", which translates to We will rock the world. The first anthem of Mumbai Indians was based on this motto, wherein the Bollywood actor Hrithik Roshan was enlisted for a promotional video campaign.

The team logo is the Sudarshan Chakra (or Razor) as initially the name of the team was supposed to be "Mumbai Razors" before Sachin Tendulkar suggested to keep it Mumbai Indians.

Jersey colours
The team's primary colour is blue with golden stripes on either sides of the jersey. The team colours was almost the same in 2008 and 2009, with Idea as the principal sponsor, except for the colour shade and additional sponsors. In 2010, a new kit with golden stripes was unveiled. In 2011, kit used in 2010 is being used with Hero Honda as the main sponsor. The 2011 jersey also has three gold stripes going towards the back on the side of the jersey for the new players in the team. The kit manufacturer was Adidas from the start of IPL in 2008 till 2014. In 2015, Performax, an in-house brand of Reliance Trends, replaced Adidas as the kit manufacturer.

Players
During the player auction in 2008, the Mumbai Indians successfully bid for seven players, including two members of the Indian Twenty-20 World Cup winning side, Harbhajan Singh and Robin Uthappa. Sanath Jayasuriya, Lasith Malinga, Luke Ronchi, Dilhara Fernando and Shaun Pollock were other cricketers who were successfully bid for by the franchise.

Outside of the player auction, the franchise also signed up Ajinkya Rahane and Abhishek Nayar (from Mumbai), Yogesh Takawale (WK-Batsman from Maharashtra) and Pinal Shah (WK-Batsman from Baroda). Saurabh Tiwary and Manish Pandey, the members of the U-19 World Cup winning team were the random picks drafted in during the second auction. Dominic Thornely was also signed by the Mumbai Indians for a sum of $30,000. South African fast bowler André Nel was signed on in the place of Dwayne Bravo who left the tournament early.

In the 2009 player auction, the Mumbai Indians signed up South African player, JP Duminy for $950,000. He was the third most expensive pick after Kevin Pietersen and Andrew Flintoff (both signed up for $1.55 million by Royal Challengers Bangalore and Chennai Super Kings respectively). In addition, Kyle Mills and Mohammad Ashraful for $150,000 and $75,000 respectively were bought by MI management. The team also signed Graham Napier and Ryan McLaren at the pre-auction signings.

In the IPL 2010, Mumbai Indians bought West Indian all-rounder Kieron Pollard for $750,000 ($2,750,000) after a silent tie-breaker with Chennai Super Kings, Royal Challengers Bangalore and the Kolkata Knight Riders, after he impressed the teams with his performances at KFC Twenty20 Big Bash and Champions League Twenty20.

In 2011, as two new teams were added to the IPL, the IPL Governing Council declared that each franchise could retain a maximum of four players of their squad, only three of whom can be Indian players, and the rest of the international players would be put in the mega-auction. The Mumbai franchise, keen to have the same set of core players, retained captain Sachin Tendulkar, vice-captain Harbhajan Singh, all-rounder Kieron Pollard and fast bowler Lasith Malinga for a total of $4.5 million. The retention left them with the power of spending only $4.5 million at the mega-auction. At the auction, they purchased Rohit Sharma as one of the costliest players in the auction along with Munaf Patel, Andrew Symonds, Aiden Blizzard, a hard-hitting Australian batsman and James Franklin, an all-rounder from New Zealand.

At the 2012 IPL player auction, Mumbai Indians bought South Africans Richard Levi and Robin Peterson for $50,000 and $100,000 respectively, Australian fast bowler Mitchell Johnson for $300,000, Indian fast bowler R. P. Singh for $600,000 and Sri Lankan all-rounder Thisara Perera for $650,000.

After the auctions, Mumbai Indians managed to get South African explosive opener Richard Levi, who shot into limelight after hitting the fastest century in T20 international cricket and hitting a record 13 sixes, after a bidding war with Pune Warriors India. Richard Levi was brought in as a replacement for Andrew Symonds, who retired from all forms of the game citing family reasons. Sachin Tendulkar stepped down as Mumbai Indians captain ahead of the IPL 2012 season-opener against Chennai.

At the 2013 IPL player auction, former Australian captain Ricky Ponting was purchased by Mumbai Indians for $400,000 and he became the new captain for sixth edition of IPL. Also at the auction, Glenn Maxwell was purchased by Mumbai Indians. Also, Phillip Hughes, Nathan Coulter-Nile, and Jacob Oram were purchased by MI Management.

Seasons

Indian Premier League

Champions League T20

Current squad
 Players with international caps are listed in bold.

Administration and support staff

Kit manufacturers and sponsors
American multinational corporation – MasterCard was the official founding sponsor of the Mumbai Indians, while Adidas was their official apparel sponsor until 2014. Since then, the UAE's national carrier Etihad Airways signed a three-year contract and took over as one of the principle sponsors of Mumbai Indians. In 2015, Performax, the in-house brand of Reliance Trends, took over as the apparel sponsors. Associate sponsors and official partners include Bridgestone, Dheeraj and East Coast LLC, Kingfisher, Wrigley's Orbit, Wrigley's Boomer, Royal Stag, Air India, MSN and Red FM 93.5.
Hero MotoCorp was also one of the main sponsors of Mumbai Indians for 2011 and 2012 seasons. The principal sponsors of Mumbai Indians are Videocon d2h since 2013. In 2015, companies such as USHA, Jack & Jones, HTC, Tiny Owl, Paytm, Ola Cabs, DNA and Fever 104 FM came on board. From 2016, DHFL and Samsung joined as the new associate sponsors. Along with them, Pepsi, yatra.com, Radio City, LYF smartphones and Guvera came in as the new official sponsors. The global fashion brand Diesel's first ever association with cricket will produce a limited edition collection which will be available globally across popular cricket playing nations.

Rivalries

Rivalry with Chennai Super Kings 

Chennai Super Kings and Mumbai Indians have played against each other more number of times than any other two teams in the IPL. They are the two most successful IPL teams and often termed as "big spenders" at the players auction. The two sides have met each other at the final of the IPL four times, with Mumbai winning thrice and Chennai winning once. The rivalry is often referred to as the El Clasico of IPL.

Rivalry with Kolkata Knight Riders 
Both the teams play in major markets, as the Mumbai Indians play in Mumbai and the Kolkata Knight Riders play in Kolkata. The Mumbai Indians is the most successful IPL franchise with five championships, but until Mumbai's third championship, both the teams were tied with two championships. In the first two seasons of the IPL, Mumbai swept Kolkata in all four games. It was not until the 2010 IPL Season that Kolkata won against Mumbai. Both sides have been captained by Indian cricket legends at one point (Mumbai was captained by Sachin Tendulkar, and Kolkata was captained by Sourav Ganguly). This rivalry has often played out in Mumbai's favour, as they have won 22 games compared to Kolkata's seven wins. Both have played each other twice in the playoffs.

In 2011, both teams played against each other in the Eliminator round, as both franchises made their first playoff appearances. This was the first time that the two teams met in the playoffs. Mumbai won the match by four wickets and advanced to the next round, ultimately losing to the Royal Challengers Bangalore.

In 2012, both the teams were chasing a playoff spot in the tournament. The game started out poorly for KKR as their batting side did not score runs. KKR picked up the pace and ended the innings with 140/7. Mumbai was expected to win at that point and started to attack quickly, and started 60/2 with more than 10 overs left to play. Mumbai quickly collapsed and finished their innings with 108 runs and all out. Sunil Narine was named Man of the Match with 4 wickets, and KKR eliminated MI from the playoffs. KKR won its first championship that season. Knight Riders owner Shah Rukh Khan was handed a 5-year ban at Wankhede Stadium, home of the Mumbai Indians. He was accused of walking on the field post-match and abusing the security guards. In 2015, the ban was lifted.

Mumbai and Kolkata faced off in the opening match of the 2015 season. Mumbai was up to bat in the first innings as they scored 168/3. This charge was led by captain Rohit Sharma with his 98 runs. Kolkata captain, Gautam Gambhir had 57 runs and led his side to victory. Suryakumar Yadav's 46 runs were crucial to KKR's chase.

In 2017, Mumbai earned its 100th T20 win against KKR. Later that season, both sides met in the playoffs in the Qualifier 2 round. KKR had a poor batting performance as they posted 107 runs and all out. Mumbai was able to capitalise and won the match. Mumbai went onto the finals to beat Rising Pune Supergiant to claim their third championship.

From 2015 to 2018, Mumbai Indians held an eight-game winning streak against the Kolkata Knight Riders. That streak was broken on 29 April 2019, as KKR posted a total of 232 runs and won by 34 runs. KKR's Andre Russell scored 80 runs, and MI's Hardik Pandya scored 91 runs. KKR holds the record for highest total for an IPL match played at Eden Gardens. This victory was KKR's 100th T20 win. Mumbai have won all three games between them since then.

In the 2022 season, Kolkata beat Mumbai in all the matches between them.

Philanthropy

Mumbai Indians have supported the social cause of education to the underprivileged. They have raised funds for the cause via selling merchandise like wristbands signed by their players. The NGOs supported are Pratham, Ummeed, Akanksha, Teach For India and Nanhi Kali.

Statistics

Overall results in the IPL
Last updated 19 September 2020

By opposition

In popular culture
In the 2019 Netflix documentary series Cricket Fever: Mumbai Indians, the journey of the team was covered. This was the first sports related show from India to be produced by Netflix and also the first IPL side to be featured in a documentary.

References

External links
 

 
2008 establishments in Maharashtra
Indian Premier League teams
Cricket in Mumbai
Sports clubs in India
Cricket in Maharashtra
Cricket clubs established in 2008
Reliance Sports